The Rolladen-Schneider LS5 was an Open Class single seat glider aircraft designed by Rolladen-Schneider. Only a single unit was built.

Design and development
The LS5 was announced in 1980 as Rolladen-Schneider’s entry into the exclusive Open Class. The economic viability of the design was compromised, however, with the arrival in 1981 of the Schempp-Hirth Nimbus-3 and the Schleicher ASW 22, both of which outclassed the predicted performance of the yet-to-fly LS5. Although the moulds had already been completed, Rolladen-Schneider decided not to pursue further development. Klaus Mies from Kaiserslautern used these moulds to produce one glider of the type. This homebuilt prototype made its maiden flight in 1988, receiving the registration number D-7742. It is based at Marpingen in Germany.

Specifications

See also
List of gliders

References 

Geistmann D, Segelflugzeuge in Deutschland, Motorbuch Verlag
LS-Flugzeugbau website
sailplanedirectory.com

1980s German sailplanes
Rolladen-Schneider aircraft
Aircraft first flown in 1988
T-tail aircraft